ScaleSeven (S7) is a set of finescale model railway standards for 1:43.5 (7 mm scale) using true-to-prototype track and wheel standards. It is principally used to model British standard gauge, Irish Broad Gauge, or Great Western broad gauge.

See also

 Rail transport modelling scales
 Model railway scales

References

External links
 ScaleSeven Group

7 mm scale